Humanes is a municipality of Spain in the province of Guadalajara, an autonomous community of Castilla-La Mancha, with an area of 48.98 km² (18.91 mi²), population of 1,272 (2004 estimate), and a density of 26.51 people/km² (67.27 people/mi²).

References

Municipalities in the Province of Guadalajara